Dimitris Voyatzis, born Dimitrios Voyatzis, was a Greek film director, actor, producer, editor, a screenwriter and a folk musician.

His films 

His films include: Hobby mou... o Viasmos (My hobbies include... Rape), O Skyllas (The Dog-man), I Lires tou Antarti (The Guerrilla's bullions) (Italics indicate a romanization of the Greek title, while parentheses indicate a literal translation into English).

They were shot with very low production values, somewhat ineptly and were intended for public screening in cafés of cities and towns of northern Greece that belonged to friends of his. His films' leads were always characters characteristically flawed, marginalized, criminals, ostracised by the law, yet striving for ideals such as atonemenent, redemption, or love. Or, predators, monsters bent on revenge on Hoi polloi, out to satisfy their most base desires. People who lived in the worst of conditions, in sleaze and decaying urban hubs, under suspicion and distrust, who faced horrible, powerful villains, the threat of the often corrupt police. Ex convicts, rapists, smugglers, they were very close to the definition of an anti-hero, offbeat heroes covered in filth with whom the viewer easily sympathized, facing abhorrent enemies, or worse, themselves; it can be argued that, perhaps unintentionally, his plots, motifs and characters bear a strong resemblance to those found in works of transgressive fiction.

In two out of his three (O Skyllas & Hobby mou...) directed feature films, he co-starred with the Greek cult actor Kostas Stefanakis.

Since his films were not released for the video market, they have always been difficult to track. His films were later released through the Greek video label Onar films.

His life 
According to his close associate Tasos Aggelopoulos, he wasn't working; his income and funds for his films came from his wealthy family. As a folk musician, he played with bands in fairs around Greece. He never married, nor had children. This information, however, does not seem credible, as Dimitri Voyatzis' son, George Voyiatzis, appears on his film, "O Skyllas" and also on the title of his film company.

Lary-Skot productions 

With Mr. Aggelopoulos, they founded the film company Lary-Skot productions (a.k.a. Larry Scott video production, a reference to the American bodybuilder Larry Scott) and through it produced and "released" his films. Other productions of Lary-Skot productions include the film O Fotografos kai ta manoulia tou (The photographer and his babes) and O Videoclubas (The Video rental Guy). Lary-Skot productions was located in Pagrati, in Athens, Greece. After his death, the company passed to Mr. Aggelopoulos, a wedding videographer at the time of the film productions and currently an electrician, who worked with Mr. Voyatzis as a cinematographer, a co-director, a gaffer and a boom operator. Mr. Aggelopoulos considers Voyatzis's films garbage and admits that he has lost any negatives and film copies of the Lary-Skot films.

A Dimitris Voyatzis renaissance 
While it has been several years since Mr. Voyatzis's death, due to screenings in Greek cult film festivals, his films started reaching new audiences and have become more popular than ever.

References

External links 
 
 incorrect profile at Cine.gr

Greek film directors
Greek male actors
Greek folk musicians
Greek music
Living people
Year of birth missing (living people)